Yang Bozun (born March 23, 1986) is a Chinese swimmer. At the 2012 Summer Paralympics he won 3 gold medals, 2 silver medals and 1 bronze medal.

References

Paralympic swimmers of China
Swimmers at the 2012 Summer Paralympics
Paralympic gold medalists for China
Living people
World record holders in paralympic swimming
1986 births
Paralympic silver medalists for China
Paralympic bronze medalists for China
Medalists at the 2012 Summer Paralympics
Medalists at the 2008 Summer Paralympics
Swimmers at the 2008 Summer Paralympics
S11-classified Paralympic swimmers
Paralympic medalists in swimming
Chinese male medley swimmers
Chinese male freestyle swimmers
Chinese male backstroke swimmers
Chinese male breaststroke swimmers
21st-century Chinese people